Maipure–Avane is a Glottolog classification that includes:

 Maipure language
 Avane language

References

Glottolog languages that correspond to more than one Wikipedia article